Three Springs may refer to:

 Three Springs, Pennsylvania
 Three Springs, Western Australia